The Olyokma-Chara Plateau  is a mountainous area in the Sakha Republic and Irkutsk Oblast, Far Eastern Federal District, Russia. A small section is in Kalarsky District, northernmost Zabaykalsky Krai. 

Charoite, a rare mineral, is found in the Murun Massif area of the plateau, rising between rivers Chara and Tokko.

Geography 
The Olyokma-Chara Plateau is located to the south of the Lena, at the southwestern end of the Sakha Republic in Olyokminsky District, and the eastern end of Irkutsk Oblast, Bodaybinsky District. The plateau is bound by the Chara River, a left tributary of the Olyokma river to the west and the Olyokma, a left tributary of the Lena, to the east. The Tokko River, the largest tributary of the Chara, crosses the uplands from south to north. To the south rises the Udokan Range of the Stanovoy Highlands and to the north the Lena Plateau. To the east rise the Aldan Highlands and to the west the Patom Highlands. There are vestiges of ancient glaciation throughout the plateau area. 

The plateau is largely uninhabited. The settlement of Torgo, Olyokminsky District, was abandoned in 2010.

Geology
Part of the Olyokma-Chara Plateau falls within the Aldan Shield geological region. The plateau is composed of the Lower Paleozoic limestones in its northern part, and in the southern by Precambrian metamorphic shales, with granite intrusions.

Flora
The mountains of the highlands are covered by larch taiga in the lower and middle slopes. Siberian pine scrub and mountain tundra grow at higher altitudes.

See also
List of mountains and hills of Russia
Olyokma Nature Reserve

References

External links
Fishing in the Tokko River (South Yakutia)
Charoite from the Murunskii Massif, Chara and Tokko Rivers Confluence
Mountain ranges of Russia
Mountain ranges of the Sakha Republic
Mountains of Irkutsk Oblast
Mountains of Zabaykalsky Krai
South Siberian Mountains
ru:Олёкмо-Чарское плоскогорье
sah:Өлүөхүмэ-Чаара хаптал хайалаах сир